The 2015 Euro Beach Soccer League (EBSL) is an annual European competition in beach soccer. The competitions allows national teams to compete in beach soccer in a league format over the summer months. Each season ends with a Superfinal, deciding the competition winner.

This season, there were twelve teams each participating in two divisions in each stage that faced each other in a round-robin system. Division A consisted of 11 teams from last season's Division A, plus Hungary who were promoted. Division B consisted of 8 of the lower ranked teams and new entries to the competition. Each division has its own regulations and competition format.

Due to the beach soccer event at the 2015 European Games (24–28 June) and the 2015 FIFA Beach Soccer World Cup (9–19 July) scheduled to take place right in the middle of the typical EBSL season of June to August, BSWW were forced to organise a shorter season than usual, featuring an abnormally low amount of regular season stages of fixtures (two, rather than the customary three or four). Consequently, whereas each Division A nation would usually take part in two stages, this season they only took part in one.

Calendar 

All times are CEST (UTC+02:00).

Teams

Stage 1 (Moscow, 12–14 June)

Division A

Group 1

Group 2

Schedule and results

Individual Awards 
MVP:  Gabriele Gori
Top scorer:  Gabriele Gori,  Ihar Bryshtel,  Zé Maria (5 goals)
Best goalkeeper:  Ivan Ostrovsky

Stage 2 (Siófok, 7–9 August)

Division A

Schedule and results

Division B

Group 1

Group 2

Schedule and results

Individual Awards 
MVP:  Noël Ott
Top scorer:  Dejan Stankovic (10 goals)
Best goalkeeper:  Volodymyr Hladchenko

Cumulative standings 
The eight best placed teams in Division A qualified for the Superfinal. The qualifiers for the Promotion Final were the eight best placed teams in Division B and the last placed team in Division A.

Ranking & tie-breaking criteria: 1. Points earned 2. Highest stage placement 3. Goal difference 4. Goals scored.

Division A

Division B 

Since Division A teams only participated in one stage this season, tie-breaking criteria were different than usual for the top tier. Instead of teams tied on points then ranked on goal difference, teams tied were then ranked based on who placed the highest in the group of the stage they played in (as is usual in Division B). If the two teams both finished in the same position in their respective groups, only then was goal difference used.

Hence, of the five teams on three points, France finished highest having finished 2nd in stage one, Poland last having finished 4th in stage one. Meanwhile the other three all finished in 3rd place in their respective stage groups so were then ranked by goal difference.

Finals (Pärnu, 20–23 August)

Promotional Final (Division B)

Teams

 
 
 
  (automatic qualification as hosts)

  (worst-ranked team in Division A)

Group 1 Standings

Group 2 Standings

Schedule and results

Play-off results

Seventh-place Match

Fifth-place Match

Third-place Match

Promotion Final

Final Division B Standing

Superfinal (Division A)

Teams

Group 1 Standings

Group 2 Standings

Schedule and results

Play-off results

Seventh-place Match

Fifth-place Match

Third-place Match

Championship final Match

Individual Awards
MVP:  Igor Borsuk
Top Scorer:  Dejan Stankovic (13 goals)
Best Goalkeeper:  Elinton Andrade

Final Division A Standing

Sources 

 Group distribution for EBSL 2015 announced. Beach Soccer Worldwide.

References

External links 

 Beach Soccer Worldwide

Euro Beach Soccer League
2015 in beach soccer